A Heart of Gold is a 1915 American silent romantic drama short film directed by Tom Ricketts starring Harry von Meter, Reaves Eason, Louise Lester, Jack Richardson, and Vivian Rich.

Cast
 Harry von Meter as Jim
 Jack Richardson as Jake Price
 Reaves Eason as Fred
 Vivian Rich as Mary Price, Jake's Wife
 Louise Lester as Mrs. Carr

External links

1915 films
1915 romantic drama films
American romantic drama films
American silent short films
American black-and-white films
1915 short films
Films directed by Tom Ricketts
1910s American films
Silent romantic drama films
Silent American drama films